Victor Stanley Feldman (7 April 1934 – 12 May 1987) was an English jazz musician who played mainly piano, vibraphone, and percussion. He began performing professionally during childhood, eventually earning acclaim in the UK jazz scene as an adult. Feldman emigrated to the United States in the mid-1950s, where he continued working in jazz and also as a session musician with a variety of pop and rock performers.

Early life
Feldman was born in Edgware on 7 April 1934. He caused a sensation as a musical prodigy when he was "discovered", aged seven. His family were all musical and his father founded the Feldman Swing Club in London in 1942 to showcase his talented sons. Feldman performed from a young age: "from 1941 to 1947 he played drums in a trio with his brothers; when he was nine he took up piano and when he was 14 started playing vibraphone". He featured in the films King Arthur Was a Gentleman (1942) and Theatre Royal (1943). In 1944, he was featured at a concert with Glenn Miller's AAAF band, as "Kid Krupa" (in reference to drummer Gene Krupa). He also "took a prominent role in the musical Piccadilly Hayride" (1946–1948).

Professional life and career
His drums teacher Carlo Krahmer encouraged Feldman to play the vibraphone which he did first in the Ralph Sharon Sextet and later in the Roy Fox band. Feldman played with Vic Lewis and Ted Heath. Feldman played with Sharon from late 1949 to 1951, including performances in Switzerland. There were further overseas trips with Ronnie Scott (to Paris in 1952), and Harry Parry (to India). He also played with Parry in the UK from October 1953 to January 1954. From 1954, when he recorded with Jimmy Deuchar, and played again with Scott, "he was working mainly as a pianist and vibraphonist; his early vibraphone playing showed the influence of Milt Jackson".

He was a notable percussionist, but it was as a pianist and vibraphone player that he became best known.

Before leaving the UK to work in the US, Feldman recorded with Ronnie Scott's orchestra and quintet from 1954 to 1955, which also featured other important British jazz musicians such as Phil Seamen and Hank Shaw. It was Scott who recommended that Feldman emigrate to the US, which he did in 1955. Once there, his first steady work was with the Woody Herman Herd. He had frequent return trips to the UK over the following years. His 8-week visit in 1956–57 included studio recording sessions and club appearances. After Herman he joined Buddy DeFranco for a short time. In 1958, he had his own working band on the west coast, which included the innovative bassist Scott LaFaro. His 1958 album The Arrival of Victor Feldman includes LaFaro and Stan Levey on drums. He recorded with many jazz artists, including Benny Goodman, George Shearing, Cannonball Adderley and Miles Davis, most notably on Davis' 1963 album Seven Steps to Heaven, the title tune being his own composition. Davis invited Feldman to join his group full-time, but Feldman declined, preferring the stability of studio work to the career of a touring musician. The 5-CD Shelly Manne Black Hawk set, originally released on LP in September 1959, is a good representation of Feldman's unmistakable driving comping behind the soloists, helping to define the session as a valuable hard bop genre element.

In 1957, Feldman settled in Los Angeles permanently and then specialised in lucrative session work for the US film and recording industry, with the exception of joining the Cannonball Adderley Quintet in 1960-61. He also branched out to work with a variety of musicians outside of jazz, recording with artists such as Frank Zappa in 1967, Steely Dan and Joni Mitchell in the 1970s and Tom Waits and Joe Walsh in the 1980s. It is Feldman's percussion work on Steely Dan's song "Do It Again" that gives the song its Latin groove. Feldman appears on all seven Steely Dan albums released in the 1970s and 1980 in the band's first incarnation.

Feldman's vibraphone soloing is featured extensively on the Grammy Award-winning The Music from Peter Gunn, with AllMusic writing, "There's some particularly impressive work by drummer Shelly Manne and vibes player Victor Feldman, whose cool, understated playing seems to deliberately recall that of Milt Jackson."

Feldman died of a heart attack in 1987 at his home in Los Angeles, aged 53, following an asthma attack.

In 2009, he was inducted in the Musicians Hall of Fame and Museum in Nashville.

Discography

As leader

Main source:

As sideman
With Arthur Adams
 I Love Love Love My Lady (A&M, 1979)
With Pepper Adams
 California Cookin' (Interplay, 1983 [1991])
With Cannonball Adderley
 Cannonball Adderley and the Poll Winners (Riverside, 1960)
 The Cannonball Adderley Quintet at the Lighthouse (Riverside, 1960)
 Live in Europe (Pablo, 1984) (Fantasy, 1994)
 Paris 1960 (Fantasy, 1997)
 The Cannonball Adderley Quintet Plus (Riverside, 1961)
With Nat Adderley
 A Little New York Midtown Music (Galaxy, 1978)
With Alessi Brothers
 Alessi (A&M Records, 1976)
 Long Time Friends (Qwest Records, 1982)
With Peter Allen
 I Could Have Been a Sailor (A&M Records, 1979)
 Not the Boy Next Door (Arista Records, 1983)
With Gregg Allman Band
 Playin' Up a Storm (Capricorn Records, 1977)
With Curtis Amy
 Way Down (Pacific Jazz, 1962)
With Patti Austin
 Patti Austin (Qwest Records, 1984)
With Hoyt Axton
 Southbound (A&M Records, 1975)
With The Beach Boys
 L.A. (Light Album) (CBS Records, 1979)
With Bob Bennett
 Non-Fiction (Star Song, 1985)
With Stephen Bishop
 Careless (ABC Records, 1976)
With Bobby Bland
 Reflections in Blue (ABC Records, 1977)
With Karla Bonoff
 Wild Heart of the Young (Columbia Records, 1982)
With Terence Boylan
 Terence Boylan (Asylum, 1977)
 Suzy (Asylum, 1980)
With Toni Brown
 Toni Brown (Fantasy, 1980)
With Solomon Burke
 Electronic Magnetism (MGM Records, 1971)
With Kim Carnes
 St. Vincent's Court (EMI, 1979)
With Valerie Carter
 Wild Child (ARC, 1978)
With Johnny Cash
 John R. Cash (Columbia, 1975)
With Kerry Chater
 Part Time Love (Warner Bros. Records, 1977)
 Love on a Shoestring (Warner Bros. Records, 1978)
With Cher
 I'd Rather Believe in You (Warner Bros. Records, 1976)
 Cher (Casablanca Records, 1979)
 Prisoner (Casablanca Records, 1979)
With James Clay
 A Double Dose of Soul (Riverside, 1960)
With Rita Coolidge
 Never Let You Go (A&M Records, 1983) 
With Bob Cooper
 Coop! The Music of Bob Cooper (Contemporary, 1958)
With Christopher Cross
 Christopher Cross (Columbia Records, 1979)
With Dalbello
 Pretty Girls (Talisman, 1979)
With Kiki Dee
 Stay With Me (Rocket, 1978)
With Buddy DeFranco
 Blues Bag (Vee-Jay, 1965)
With Jackie DeShannon
 New Arrangement (Columbia Records, 1975)
With Cliff De Young
 Cliff De Young (MCA, 1975)
With Neil Diamond
 Heartlight (Columbia Records, 1982)
With The 5th Dimension
 Love's Lines, Angles and Rhymes (Bell, 1971)
With Dion DiMucci
 Streetheart (Warner Bros. Records, 1976)
With The Doobie Brothers
 Stampede (Warner Bros. Records, 1975)
 Livin' on the Fault Line (Warner Bros. Records, 1977)
With Charlie Dore
 Listen! (Chrysalis Records, 1981)
With Yvonne Elliman
 Yvonne (RSO Records, 1979)
With Phil Everly
 Star Spangled Springer (RCA Records, 1973)
With The Everly Brothers
 The Everly Brothers Sing (Warner Bros. Records, 1967)
With José Feliciano
 10 to 23 (RCA Victor, 1969)
With Michael Franks
 Objects of Desire (Warner Bros. Records, 1982)
With The Free Movement
 I've Found Someone of My Own (Columbia Records, 1972)
With Glenn Frey
 The Allnighter (MCA Records, 1984)
With Richie Furay
 Dance a Little Light (Asylum Records, 1978)
With Ted Gärdestad
 Blue Virgin Isles (Polar, 1978)
With Terry Garthwaite
 Hand in Glove (Fantasy, 1978)
With Marvin Gaye
 Let's Get It On (Motown, 1973)
With Amy Grant
 A Christmas Album (Myrrh Records, 1983)
With Cyndi Grecco
 Making Our Dreams Come True (Private Stock Records, 1976)
With Lani Hall
 Blush (A&M, 1980)
With Albert Hammond
 Albert Hammond (Mums Records, 1974)
With Woody Herman
 At the Monterey Jazz Festival (Atlantic, 1959)
With Dan Hill
 If Dreams Had Wings (Epic Records, 1980)
With Paul Horn
 Impressions of Cleopatra (Columbia Records, 1963)
With Thelma Houston
 I've Got the Music in Me (Sheffield Lab Records, 1975)
With Milt Jackson
 Memphis Jackson (Impulse!), 1969)
With Al Jarreau
 Jarreau (Warner Bros. Records, 1983)
With Elton John
 21 at 33 (Rocket, 1980)
 The Fox (Geffen, 1981)
With J. J. Johnson
 A Touch of Satin (Columbia Records, 1962)
 Concepts in Blue (Pablo, 1981)
With Plas Johnson
 This Must Be the Plas (Capitol Records, 1959)
With Jack Jones
 Harbour (RCA Victor, 1974)
 With One More Look at You (RCA Victor, 1977)
With Quincy Jones
 The Hot Rock OST (Prophesy, 1972)
 Roots (A&M Records, 1977)
With Rickie Lee Jones
 Rickie Lee Jones (Warner Bros. Records, 1979)
 Pirates (Warner Bros. Records, 1981)
 Girl at Her Volcano (Warner Bros. Records, 1983)
 The Magazine (Warner Bros. Records, 1984)
With Sam Jones
 The Chant (Riverside, 1961)
With Thomas Jefferson Kaye
 Thomas Jefferson Kaye (Dunhill Records, 1973)
 First Grade (Dunhill Records, 1974)
With The Keane Brothers
 The Keane Brothers (20th Century Records, 1977)
With Stan Kenton
 Hair (Capitol, 1969)
With Barney Kessel
 Let's Cook! (Contemporary, 1957 [1962])
 Carmen (Contemporary, 1958)
With B.B. King
 L.A. Midnight (ABC Records, 1972)
With Bobby King
 Bobby King (Warner Bros. Records, 1981)
With John Klemmer
 Waterfalls (Impulse!, 1972)
 Intensity (Impulse!, 1973)
With Nicolette Larson
 Nicolette (Warner Bros. Records, 1978)
 In the Nick of Time (Warner Bros. Records, 1979)
With Peggy Lee
 If You Go (Capitol, 1961)
 Then Was Then – Now Is Now! (Capitol, 1965)
 Make It With You (Capitol, 1970)
 Norma Deloris Egstrom from Jamestown, North Dakota (Capitol, 1972)
 Mirrors (A&M, 1975)
With Ketty Lester
 Ketty Lester (Records By Pete, 1969)
With Gordon Lightfoot
 Shadows (Warner Bros. Records, 1982)
With Lulu
 Lulu (Polydor Records, 1973)
With Mary MacGregor
 ...In Your Eyes (Ariola Records, 1978)
With Henry Mancini
 The Music from Peter Gunn (RCA Records, 1959)
With Shelly Manne
 Shelly Manne & His Men Play Peter Gunn (Contemporary, 1959)
 Son of Gunn!! (Contemporary, 1959)
 At the Black Hawk 1 (Contemporary, 1959)
 At the Black Hawk 2 (Contemporary, 1959)
 At the Black Hawk 3 (Contemporary, 1959)
 At the Black Hawk 4 (Contemporary, 1959)
 At the Black Hawk 5 (Contemporary, 1959 [1991])
 My Son the Jazz Drummer! (Contemporary, 1962)
 Daktari (Atlantic Records, 1967)
With Jon Mark
 Songs for a Friend (Columbia, 1975)
With Gene McDaniels
 Natural Juices (Ode, 1975)
With Bobby McFerrin
 Bobby McFerrin (Elektra Records, 1982)
With Kate & Anna McGarrigle
 Pronto Monto (Warner Bros. Records, 1978)
With Carmen McRae
 Can't Hide Love (Blue Note, 1976)
With Melanie
 Photograph (Atlantic Records, 1976)
 Seventh Wave (Neighbourhood Records, 1983)
With Jim Messina
 Messina (Warner Bros. Records, 1981)
With Stephanie Mills
 Merciless (Casablanca Records, 1983)
With Liza Minnelli
 Tropical Nights (Columbia, 1977)
With Adam Mitchell
 Redhead in Trouble (Warner Bros. Records, 1979)
With Blue Mitchell
 Stablemates (Candid Records, 1977)
With Joni Mitchell
 The Hissing of Summer Lawns (Asylum Records, 1975)
 Hejira (A&M Records, 1976)
 Wild Things Run Fast (Geffen, 1982)
With Melba Moore
 Peach Melba (Buddah Records, 1975)
With Maria Muldaur
 Sweet Harmony (Reprise Records, 1976)
 Open Your Eyes (Warner Bros. Records, 1979)
With Michael Martin Murphey
 Flowing Free Forever (Epic Records, 1976)
 Lone Wolf (Epic Records, 1978)
 The Heart Never Lies (Liberty Records, 1983)
With Anne Murray
 Together (Capitol, 1975)
 Where Do You Go When You Dream (Capitol, 1981)
With Oliver Nelson
 Zig Zag (MGM, 1970)
With Michael Nesmith
 The Wichita Train Whistle Sings (Dot Records, 1968)
With Randy Newman
 Born Again (Warner Bros. Records, 1979)
With Olivia Newton-John
 Totally Hot (MCA Records, 1978)
 Physical (MCA Records, 1981)
With Kenny Nolan
 A Song Between Us (Polydor, 1978)
With Freda Payne
 Out of Payne Comes Love (ABC, 1975)
With Leslie Pearl
 Words & Music (RCA Records, 1982)
With Art Pepper and Zoot Sims
 Art 'n' Zoot (Pablo, 1981 [1995])
With Esther Phillips
 All About Esther (Mercury Records, 1978)
With Sam Phillips
 Dancing with Danger (Myrrh Records, 1984)
With June Pointer
 Baby Sister (Planet Records, 1983)
With Jean-Luc Ponty and Frank Zappa
 King Kong: Jean-Luc Ponty Plays the Music of Frank Zappa (World Pacific Jazz, 1970)
With Billy Preston
 Pressin' On (Motown, 1982)
With Helen Reddy
 Music, Music (Capitol Records, 1976)
With Minnie Riperton
 Minnie (Capitol Records, 1979)
With Kenny Rogers and Dolly Parton
 Once Upon a Christmas (RCA Records, 1984)
With Sonny Rollins
 Sonny Rollins and the Contemporary Leaders (Contemporary, 1958)
With Brenda Russell
 Brenda Russell (Horizon Records, 1979)
With Evie Sands
 Estate Of Mind (Haven Records, 1974)
 Suspended Animation (RCA Victor, 1979)
With Leo Sayer
 Here (Chrysalis Records, 1979)
With Boz Scaggs
 Down Two Then Left (Columbia Records, 1977)
With Lalo Schifrin
 Gone with the Wave (Colpix, 1964)
 The Cincinnati Kid (MGM, 1965)
With Seals and Crofts
 Seals & Crofts (TA Records, 1969)
 Year of Sunday (Warner Bros. Records, 1971)
 The Longest Road (Warner Bros. Records, 1980)
With Bud Shank
 Girl in Love (World Pacific, 1966)
 Bud Shank Plays Music from Today's Movies (World Pacific, 1967)
 Magical Mystery (World Pacific, 1967)
With Carly Simon
 Another Passenger (Elektra Records, 1976)
With Dusty Springfield
 Cameo (ABC Dunhill Records, 1973)
With Candi Staton
 Young Hearts Run Free (Warner Bros. Records, 1976)
 House of Love (Warner Bros. Records, 1978)
With Steely Dan
 Can't Buy a Thrill (ABC Records, 1972)
 Countdown to Ecstasy (ABC Records, 1973)
 Pretzel Logic (ABC Records, 1974)
 Katy Lied (ABC Records, 1975)
 The Royal Scam (ABC Records, 1976)
 Aja (ABC Records, 1977)
 FM (No Static at All) (MCA Records, 1978)
 Gaucho (MCA Records, 1980)
With James Taylor
 Gorilla (Warner Bros. Records, 1975)
 In the Pocket (Warner Bros. Records, 1976)
With Livingston Taylor
 Man's Best Friend (Epic Records, 1980)
With Willie Tee
 Anticipation (United Artists Records, 1976)
With The Manhattan Transfer
 Pastiche (Atlantic, 1978)
 Mecca for Moderns (Atlantic, 1981)
With Gino Vannelli
 Brother to Brother (A&M Records, 1978)
With Leroy Vinnegar
 Leroy Walks! (Contemporary, 1958)
 Leroy Walks Again!!! (Contemporary, 1963)
With Tom Waits
 Heartattack and Vine (Asylum Records, 1980)
 Swordfishtrombones (Island Records, 1983)
With Narada Michael Walden
 Awakening (Atlantic, 1979)
With Wendy Waldman
 The Main Refrain (Warner Bros. Records, 1976)
With Joe Walsh
 There Goes the Neighborhood (Asylum Records, 1981)
With Dionne Warwick
 Love at First Sight (Warner Bros. Records, 1977)
 Friends in Love (Arista Records, 1982)
With Wayne Watson
 Man in the Middle (Milk & Honey, 1984)
With Jimmy Webb
 Angel Heart (Real West Production, 1982)
With Deniece Williams
 Song Bird (Columbia Records, 1977)
With Joe Williams
 With Love (Temponic, 1972)
With Gerald Wilson
 Feelin' Kinda Blues (Pacific Jazz, 1965)
 On Stage (Pacific Jazz, 1965)
 The Golden Sword (Pacific Jazz, 1966)
With Renn Woods
 Out of the Woods (Columbia, 1979)
With Betty Wright
 Betty Wright (Epic Records, 1981)
With The Youngbloods
 Elephant Mountain (RCA Victor, 1969)
With Frank Zappa
 Lumpy Gravy (Capitol Records, 1968)

References

Bibliography

External links
Interview with Les Tomkins

Victor Feldman discography

1934 births
1987 deaths
English jazz pianists
British jazz vibraphonists
American male jazz musicians
British percussionists
Cool jazz pianists
West Coast jazz pianists
People from Edgware
People from Woodland Hills, Los Angeles
English Jews
Contemporary Records artists
Vee-Jay Records artists
Riverside Records artists
Palo Alto Records artists
English expatriates in the United States
English jazz drummers
British male drummers
20th-century British pianists
20th-century English musicians
Maracas players
Tambourine players
Conga players
Triangle players
Marimbists
Snare drummers
Tubular bells players
Timbaleros
Timpanists
Bass drum players
Bongo players
20th-century American drummers
American male drummers
British male pianists
L.A. Express members
Cannonball Adderley Quintet members
The T-Bones members
20th-century American male musicians